Peziotrichum is a genus of ascomycete fungus. It is an entomogenous fungus, meaning that it is found growing on the body of insects.

References 

Nectriaceae genera